Fun Radio may refer to:

Fun Radio (France), a major radio station in France
Fun Radio (Belgium), a radio station in Belgium
Fun Rádio, a Slovak commercial radio station
Fun Kids, British children's digital radio station earlier known as Fun Radio